The men's light welterweight event was part of the boxing programme at the 1960 Summer Olympics. The weight class allowed boxers of up to 63.5 kilograms to compete. The competition was held from 25 August to 5 September 1960. 34 boxers from 34 nations competed.

Competition format

The competition was a single-elimination tournament, with no bronze medal match (two bronze medals were awarded, one to each semifinal loser).

Results
Results of the light welterweight boxing competition.

Top half

Bottom half

Finals

References

Light Welterweight